Falcon Air was a cargo and passenger airline based in Malmö, Sweden. It operated mail transport services at night and day flights on contract for FlyMe. Its main base was Malmö/Sturup Airport. 

It should not be confused with Falconair, which between May 1967 and 1 September 1970 operated three Vickers Viscount and three Lockheed L-188 Electra, based at Malmö Bulltofta Airport.

History 
The airline started air cargo operations in October 1986. It was acquired by Postbolagen in two phases in 1987 and 1988.
The airline ceased operations in 2006.

Destinations 
Falcon Air operated mail transport during the night from/to Stockholm, Malmö, Umeå, Luleå and Sundsvall in January 2005.

Fleet 
The Falcon Air fleet consisted of the following aircraft (at August 2006):
3 - Boeing 737-300QC

See also
 Transport in Sweden

References

Notes

Bibliography 
 Klee, Ulrich & Bucher, Frank et al. jp airline-fleets international. Zürich-Airport, 1966–2007

External links 

Defunct airlines of Sweden
Airlines established in 1986
Airlines disestablished in 2006
Companies based in Malmö
Swedish companies established in 1986
Swedish companies disestablished in 2006